Falko E. P.  Wilms (born July 30, 1961) is a German economist and social scientist. He is a professor, consultant and coach.

Academic life
He studied Economics and Social Sciences at the Lüneburg University (Germany),
where he earned his first degree in 1989 and later a Ph.D. in economics in 1994. His Ph.D. thesis entitled Multi Criteria Decision Making (MCDM) was supervised by Egbert Kahle.
Since 1998 he has been a Professor of Organizational Behavior at Vorarlberg University of Applied Sciences in Dornbirn, Austria. There he created a communication and collaboration study group, which he still leads today.

Research interests
Wilms’ research focuses on Management Studies. He is of the opinion that management is a profession concerned with control in certain types of systems (enterprises and organizations). Therefore, he embeds Niklas Luhmann’s system theory within Management Studies.

He also engages in research covering Organizational Behavior and Dialogue.

Consulting Topics
Wilms’ consulting focuses on system thinking, team building, decision making, scenario analysis, change management, Socratic dialogue and Bohm Dialogue.

Publications
 Wilms, Falko E. P. 1995. Entscheidungsverhalten als rekursiver Prozeß (trans. Decision-making behaviour as a recursive process). Gabler: Wiesbaden. .
 Wilms, Falko E.P. 2001. Systemorientiertes Management (trans. System-oriented management). Vahlen: Munich.
 Wilms, Falko E. P. 2006. Szenariotechnik. Vom Umgang mit der Zukunft (trans. The scenario technique: How to cope with the future). Haupt: Bern.
 Wilms, Falko E. P. & Thiel, M. 2007. Unternehmensführung (trans. Corporate management). Haupt: Bern.
 Wilms, Falko E. P. & Jancsary, P. M. 2008.  Über das Dialogische (trans. Concerning the dialogic). wvb: Berlin.

Journals
Since 2000 Editor of the biannual journal SEM-RADAR Zeitschrift für Systemdenken und Entscheidungsfindung im Management (trans. SEM-RADAR Journal of Systems Thinking and Decision Making in Management) ISSN 1610-8914

External links

   official website from Falko E. P. Wilms as a consultant
  official website from Falko E. P. Wilms as a professor (german)
  official profil from Falko E. P. Wilms in about.me

1961 births
Writers from Bremen
Academic staff of the Vorarlberg University of Applied Sciences
German economists
Living people
20th-century German educators
21st-century German educators